Life in the Air is a three-part BBC nature documentary series narrated by Suranne Jones, first broadcast in the United Kingdom from 3 April 2016 on BBC One and rebroadcast in the U.S. under the title "SuperNature - Wild Flyers" on PBS.

Episodes

References

External links
 
 SuperNature - Wild Flyers on PBS
 

2016 British television series debuts
2016 British television series endings
BBC television documentaries
BBC high definition shows
Documentary films about nature
English-language television shows